The Molen van Aerden (English: Aerden's Mill) is a windmill located on the Raadhuisstraat 28A in Nispen, Roosendaal, in the province of North Brabant, Netherlands. Built in 1850 on an artificial hill, the windmill functioned as gristmill. The mill is a national monument (nr 32716) since 19 May 1971. The Molen van Aerden can be visited by appointment.

History 
The mill was built in 1850 and was used as a gristmill. It was built by order of Johannes van de Wijgert, who sold it four years later to Johannes Aerden from Wouw. To be less dependent on the wind, a steam engine was placed in 1883 and a petroleum engine in 1903. In 1918 the mill was connected to the electric net. However the wind was still used until 1951. In 1936, miller M. van Riet installed his system that ensured that the mill automatically adjusted its direction to the wind. In 1975 the municipality of Roosendaal en Nispen bought the mill and had it restored. In 1998 the mill was once again in working order. To maintain the mill it would have to function regularly; however this was not done enough. Therefore, it had to be restored again in 2011.

Gallery of images

See also
Other mills in North Brabant:
 Aalstermolen, in Aalst, Waalre
 Watermill at Opwetten, in Nuenen, Gerwen en Nederwetten

References

Windmills in North Brabant
Rijksmonuments in North Brabant
Tower mills in the Netherlands
Windmills completed in 1850
Roosendaal